German submarine U-174 was a Type IXC U-boat of Nazi Germany's Kriegsmarine during World War II.

She was laid down at the DeSchiMAG AG Weser yard in Bremen as yard number 1014 on 2 January 1941, launched on 21 August and commissioned on 26 November with Fregattenkapitän Ulrich Thilo in command.

U-174 began her service career with training as part of the 4th U-boat Flotilla. She was reassigned to the 10th flotilla for operations on 1 August 1942.

She was sunk by an American Lockheed Ventura on 27 April 1943.

Design
German Type IXC submarines were slightly larger than the original Type IXBs. U-174 had a displacement of  when at the surface and  while submerged. She had two shafts and two  propellers.

U-174 was fitted with six  torpedo tubes (four fitted at the bow and two at the stern), 22 torpedoes, one  SK C/32 naval gun, 180 rounds, and a  SK C/30 as well as a  C/30 anti-aircraft gun. The boat had a complement of forty-eight.

Service history

First patrol
The boat departed Kiel on 30 July 1942, moved through the North Sea and negotiated the 'gap' between Iceland and the Faroe Islands. She encountered, in mid-Atlantic Ocean, the corvette . The Norwegian ship attacked; at one point, she was so close that a depth charge projected towards the U-boat, fell on the far side of the German vessel. The submarine escaped; nevertheless, the damage inflicted was sufficient to cause U-174 to leave a tell-tale trail of oil, thus obliging Thilo to abort the patrol. She entered Lorient, on the French Atlantic coast, on 6 September.

Second patrol
For her second sortie, she sailed to the waters off Brazil. There she sank four ships between 31 October and 2 November 1942. She sank a fifth vessel on 15 December but was twice unsuccessfully attacked by American Catalina aircraft on the same day. She returned to Lorient on 9 January 1943.

Third patrol and loss
U-174 had departed her French base on 18 March 1943, bound for the eastern seaboard of North America. On 27 April, she was attacked and sunk by an American Lockheed Ventura aircraft of VB-125 southwest of Newfoundland. Fifty-three men died; there were no survivors.

Wolfpacks
U-174 took part in one wolfpack, namely:
 Lohs (11 – 26 August 1942)

Summary of raiding history

In popular culture
The U-174 is said to have been the submarine on which Xavier March served during World War II in Robert Harris's 1992 alternative history novel Fatherland.

See also
 Convoy ON 122

References

Bibliography

External links

German Type IX submarines
U-boats commissioned in 1941
U-boats sunk in 1943
World War II submarines of Germany
1941 ships
World War II shipwrecks in the Atlantic Ocean
Ships built in Bremen (state)
U-boats sunk by US aircraft
Ships lost with all hands
Maritime incidents in April 1943